San Lorenzo is a district of the San Ramón canton, in the Alajuela province of Costa Rica.

History 
San Lorenzo was created on 30 August 2016 by Acuerdo Ejecutivo N° 026-2016-MGP.

Geography 
San Lorenzo has an area of  km² and an elevation of  metres.

Locations 
Head village is Valle Azul. The district encompasses the Bajo Córdoba, Bajo Rodríguez, Cataratas, Colonia Palmareña, Coopezamora, Criques, Kooper, Los Lagos, Las Rocas and San Jorge hamlets.

Demographics 

For the 2011 census, San Lorenzo had not been created, therefore no census data is available.

Transportation

Road transportation 
The district is covered by the following road routes:
 National Route 702
 National Route 739

References 

Districts of Alajuela Province
Populated places in Alajuela Province